Hills Fork is a stream in Adams County, Ohio.

Hills Fork was named for Thomas Hill, a local landowner.

See also
List of rivers of Ohio

References

Rivers of Adams County, Ohio
Rivers of Ohio